India competed at the 1995 South Asian Games held in Madras, India. In this edition of the South Asian Games, India ranked 1st with 106 gold medals and 185 in total.

1995
1995 South Asian Games
1995 in Indian sport